Leuchtfeuer is an East German film. It was released in 1954.

External links
 Leuchtfeuer on IMDB

1954 films
1954 drama films
German drama films
East German films
1950s German-language films
Films directed by Wolfgang Staudte
Films set on islands
German black-and-white films
1950s German films